"Inside of You" is a song recorded by American rock band the Maine. The song was released digitally on May 3, 2010, and serviced to radio on June 14. The song is the lead single from their second album, Black & White. An acoustic version of the song was released on July 13, 2010.

Background
The song was written by lead singer John O'Callaghan, produced by Howard Benson, and released through Warner Records. The track runs at 133 BPM and is in the key of A major. The song peaked at number 14 on the Billboard Rock Digital Song Sales chart. 

In 2010, the song won the AP Magazine Readers’ Awards Best Song.

Music video
The music video for "Inside of You" was released on July 19, 2010. The music video is directed by Mike Jones and Jim Sullos.

The video describes the band leaving their black and white world behind to enter the crazy, colorful imagination of a young boy via his kaleidoscope below.

Track listing
Digital download 
"Inside of You" – 3:50

Acoustic version 
"Inside of You" (acoustic version) – 3:46

Charts

Release history

References

2010 songs
Song recordings produced by Howard Benson
The Maine (band) songs